The 1955–56 Czechoslovak Extraliga season was the 13th season of the Czechoslovak Extraliga, the top level of ice hockey in Czechoslovakia. 15 teams participated in the league, and Ruda Hvezda Brno won the championship.

Group A

Group B

Final

External links
History of Czechoslovak ice hockey

Czech
Czechoslovak Extraliga seasons
1955 in Czechoslovak sport
1956 in Czechoslovak sport